Atagema notacristata is a species of sea slug or dorid nudibranch, a marine gastropod mollusc in the family Discodorididae.

Distribution
The holotype for this species was collected from Punta Uvita, Parque Nacional Marino Ballena, Area de Conservación Osa, Costa Rica. Numerous specimens from Costa Rica were included in the original description. Further records from Bahía de Banderas, Mexico and Coiba Island, Panama were also reported.

References

Discodorididae
Gastropods described in 2008